The 1996 United States Senate election in Idaho took place on November 4, 1996. Incumbent Larry Craig won re-election of his second term against Democrat Walt Minnick.

Democratic primary

Candidates
 Walt Minnick, businessman and former Nixon Administration official

Results

Republican primary

Candidates
 Larry Craig, incumbent U.S. Senator

Results

General election

Candidates
 Larry Craig (R), incumbent U.S. Senator
 Walt Minnick (D), businessman and former Nixon Administration official

Results

See also
1996 United States Senate elections

References 

1996 Idaho elections
1996
Idaho